Luke Menzies (born 29 May 1988) is an English professional wrestler and former professional rugby league footballer. He is currently signed to WWE, where he performs on the SmackDown brand under the ring name Ridge Holland, and is a part of The Brawling Brutes stable.

He spent the majority of his rugby league career with various clubs in the Championship, making one appearance in the Super League for Hull Kingston Rovers in 2008. He began pursuing a career in professional wrestling in 2016 and signed with WWE in 2018.

Rugby league career 
Menzies signed for Hull Kingston Rovers in September 2007, making one appearance in the Super League in 2008. He later appeared for a number of lower league clubs such as Batley Bulldogs, Oldham, Dewsbury Rams, Hunslet, and Swinton Lions. He joined Salford Red Devils in 2014, making one appearance for the club. In 2015, he joined York City Knights on loan. Later that year, he joined Halifax on loan. In 2017, he joined the Toronto Wolfpack for their inaugural season.

Professional wrestling career

Independent circuit (2016–2018) 
Menzies was trained to be a professional wrestler by British wrestling legend Marty Jones, before making a name for himself in the North East of England for promotions like 3 Count Wrestling, New Generation Wrestling and Tidal Championship Wrestling. On 11 December 2017, Menzies made an appearance for Defiant Wrestling in a losing effort against Jurn Simmons.

On 21 April 2018, Menzies defeated El Ligero, Joseph Conners and champion Rampage Brown in a 4-Way Elimination Match to win the 3CW Championship. He ended up losing the title back to Rampage Brown a month later due to him signing a contract with WWE and relocating to Florida.

Menzies' final match on the British independent circuit took place on 23 June for Southside Wrestling, where Menzies was defeated by Gabriel Kidd.

WWE

Early appearances (2018–2020) 
In November 2016, Menzies attended a WWE tryout in Scotland. In May 2018, it was announced that he had signed with WWE. He debuted at an NXT live event on 28 July, defeating Mars Wang. On 29 August episode of NXT, he made his televised debut in a losing effort to Keith Lee. On 21 November 2019, he made his television debut for the NXT UK brand under the ring name Ridge Holland, defeating Oliver Carter.

On 7 August 2020 episode of NXT, Holland made his first appearance for the brand since 2018, taking part in a triple threat match against Oney Lorcan and Damian Priest in which the winner would go on to NXT TakeOver XXX to compete in a ladder match for the vacant NXT North American Championship, which Priest won. Dexter Lumis was soon pulled out of the ladder match at NXT TakeOver XXX due to an ankle injury, and since Holland was not pinned or submitted in his qualifying match as a result of Lorcan being pinned, he was given the chance to face Johnny Gargano on the 19 August episode of NXT with the winner being added to the ladder match; he lost due to interference from Gargano's wife Candice LeRae.

The Kings of NXT (2020–2021) 
At NXT TakeOver 31 on 4 October, after the main event of Kyle O'Reilly against Finn Bálor for the NXT Championship, he appeared at ringside carrying O'Reilly's unconscious Undisputed Era teammate Adam Cole over his shoulders, having apparently attacked Cole; he dropped Cole over the barricade in front of Bálor and O'Reilly before leaving, establishing himself as a heel. On 7 October episode of NXT, Holland brawled with Oney Lorcan and Danny Burch after defeating Burch in a match; as he caught Lorcan leaping over the top rope to deliver a cross-body, Holland's legs gave out from under him, and he had to be stretchered out of the arena, reportedly suffering an ankle dislocation and fracture in his left leg and a knee patellar dislocation and patellar tendon rupture in his right leg. 

After a nine-month absence due to injury, Holland returned on 27 July 2021 episode of NXT, assisting Oney Lorcan and Pete Dunne in defeating Tommaso Ciampa and Timothy Thatcher and subsequently beat both men down post match, teasing an alliance between the three. On 7 September episode of NXT, Holland and Dunne attacked Lorcan and Danny Burch, ending their alliance. On 12 October episode of NXT 2.0, Holland wrestled his final match on NXT, where he and Dunne lost to Kyle O'Reilly and Von Wagner.

The Brawling Brutes (2021–present) 

As part of 2021 Draft, Holland was drafted to the SmackDown brand. On 5 November episode of SmackDown, during a backstage interview, Holland referred to Sheamus as his idol. On 19 November episode of SmackDown, Holland helped Sheamus defeat Cesaro, Ricochet, and Jinder Mahal in a four-way match, starting an alliance between the two. Holland made his in-ring debut the following week on SmackDown, where he lost to Cesaro, as well as a battle royal to determine the #1 contender for the Universal Championship later that night. A rematch between Holland and Cesaro was set for 17 December episode of SmackDown, which Holland won. On 1 January 2022 at Day 1, Holland and Sheamus defeated Cesaro and Ricochet. During the match, Holland suffered a broken nose and was removed mid-match. On 29 January at Royal Rumble, Holland participated in his first Royal Rumble match at #5, lasting 19 minutes before being eliminated by AJ Styles. On 11 March episode of SmackDown, Holland and Sheamus introduced Dunne, who was subsequently renamed "Butch", as part of their stable. On the second night of WrestleMania 38 on 3 April, he and Sheamus defeated The New Day (Kofi Kingston and Xavier Woods) in a quick match. 

At Clash at the Castle on 3 September, Holland managed Sheamus against Gunther in a critically acclaimed Intercontinental Championship match; though Sheamus was unsuccessful, he received a standing ovation from the Cardiff crowd, effectively turning Holland and the Brawling Brutes face in the process. On 16 September episode of SmackDown, Holland and Butch won a fatal four-way tag team match to become the #1 contenders for the Undisputed WWE Tag Team Championship. The following week, they faced the champions The Usos for the titles in a losing effort after interference from Imperium (Ludwig Kaiser and Giovanni Vinci). Holland and Butch also appeared on 4 October episode of NXT to challenge Pretty Deadly (Elton Prince and Kit Wilson) for the NXT Tag Team Championship, but lost due to Imperium's interference. Four days later at Extreme Rules, the Brawling Brutes defeated Imperium in a six-man tag team Good Old Fashioned Donnybrook match. On 5 November at Crown Jewel, Holland and Butch failed to win the Undisputed WWE Tag Team Championship from the Usos. Three weeks later at Survivor Series WarGames on 26 November, The Brawling Brutes along with Drew McIntyre and Kevin Owens lost to The Bloodline in a WarGames match.

Championships and accomplishments
 3 Count Wrestling
 3CW Championship (1 time)
Pro Wrestling Illustrated
Ranked No. 291 of the top 500 singles wrestlers in the PWI 500 in 2022

References

External links
 
 
 
 

1988 births
Living people
Batley Bulldogs players
Dewsbury Rams players
English male professional wrestlers
English rugby league players
Halifax R.L.F.C. players
Hull Kingston Rovers players
Hunslet R.L.F.C. players
Oldham R.L.F.C. players
People from Liversedge
Rugby league props
Salford Red Devils players
Swinton Lions players
Toronto Wolfpack players
York City Knights players
21st-century professional wrestlers